José Santa Cruz (João Pessoa - 1929) is a Brazilian television actor, comedian and voice actor. He is now working on Zorra Total, a sketch comedy program on Rede Globo.

Voice acting roles 

 Danny DeVito
 Dinosaurs — Earl Sinclair, the father
 Harry Potter film series — Rubeus Hagrid (Robbie Coltrane)
 He-Man and the Masters of the Universe — King Randor
 The Transformers (TV series), Transformers: Armada and Transformers (film) — Megatron
 X-Men: Evolution — Magneto
 Toy Story 2 — Stinky Pete
 Ratatouille — Auguste Gusteau
 Troy — Nestor (John Shrapnel)
 The Closer — Clay Johnson (Barry Corbin)

References

External links 
 

Brazilian male television actors
Brazilian male voice actors
Living people
1929 births